Guillocheau is a settlement in Guadeloupe, on the island of Grande-Terre.  To its north are Lemercier, Le Moule and Conchou; Fonds d'Or and Boisvin are to the south.

Populated places in Guadeloupe